Chadarangam is a Telugu version of Indian chess, Chaturanga. It became very famous among kings and courtesans. Previously chariots (Ratha) were used in warfare, but in medieval times chariots were replaced by camels (Oṣṭra). So, the bishop in olden days was called Ratha / Śakaṭa and in medieval ages was called Oṣṭra.

Etymology
This name may be derived from the Sanskrit word Chaturanga or Persian word Chatrang. The Sanskrit word Chaturanga has a direct meaning "having four limbs". But in a military context it has meaning "an entire army (comprising elephants, chariots, cavalry, and infantry)".

The game pieces

Names

Pieces will be of two colours: black (Nalla) and white (Tella). In Telugu, pieces are called pikka (plural – pikkalu). Each side has mainly six types of pieces, namely:

Rāju (Rāja) / king
Mantri (Mantri) / queen
Śakaṭam (Ratha) / bishop
Gurram (Aśva) / knight
Enugu (Gaja) / rook
Banṭu (Sainika) / pawn

Movements
Their movements are designed accordingly in the Chadarangam as:
Rāju moves orthogonally or diagonally only one square at a time.
Mantri moves orthogonally or diagonally, any number of squares.
Śakaṭamu/Śagaṭu moves diagonally any number of squares and thus is colorbound.
Gurramu normal "L" shaped jumping move (two spaces in one direction and one space orthogonally to it). It is the only piece that can jump over other pieces.
Enugu moves orthogonally to the players (forward, backward, left or right) any number of squares.
Banṭu/Bhatudu moves one space straight forward (away from the player). On its first move it can optionally move two spaces forward. If there is an enemy piece diagonally (either left or right) one space in front of the pawn, the pawn may move diagonally to capture that piece.

Significance

The position and movements of pieces (Anga) correctly suit the reality of Indian warfare:
Rāju (king) is the most powerful, but often won't come into action unless required. The knight-move (Gurrapu Ettu) of a king (Rāja) resembles the escape of a king for a safer location at the most crucial time (Āpaddharma kāla) in warfare.
Mantri (queen) is the next most powerful person in an Indian empire/kingdom. Though the king only passes the decrees, actually it is the Prime Minister who actually decides all kinds of acts and strategies that are required for the welfare of the king/kingdom. (In Sanskrit, Mantri means Prime Minister.)
Śakaṭamu (bishop) is known for their famous zig-zag movements while attacking. Often the opponent doesn't take into consideration the presence of chariots which in turn give stunning, often devastating blows in Indian warfare. (Actually Śakaṭa is a Sanskrit word meaning chariot.)
Gurramu (knight) is known for its irregular jumping movements which often keeps the opponent in a dilemma for a moment.  Even in the game it is the Gurramu (knight) that has a greater number of moves than any other piece. (In Telugu, Gurramu means horse.)
Enugu (rook) is known for straightforward devastating attacks. Often the opponent knows its advance but cannot escape. In olden days Enugu (rook) played a very important role in scattering the army of an enemy, thereby making them deviate from their strategic movements. (In Telugu, Enugu means elephant.)
Banṭu (pawn) (also known as Bhaṭuḍu) is a piece with lowest significance though larger in number than any other piece. But when a Banṭu reaches the other end, then the honour of that position, except that of Rāju (king), is given in traditional Indian chess. Surprisingly, it is similar to the honouring of a soldier for having fought exceptionally well in a war, by a king.

Some important rules
Always the white king (Tella Rāju) should be on a black square (Nalla Gaḍi) and the black king (Nalla Rāju) should be on a white square (Tella Gaḍi).
Though defeating the opponent is the main aim, honouring the opponent's king is also very important. I.e., the game becomes very complex, if all the king's premier army is killed (the four limbs, Chatur+Anga) without using good strategy.
Either checkmate or stalemate (Rāja digbhandanam) is considered a win. In other cases, it is considered as a draw.

Terminology
In Telugu:
a move is called Ettu (here "t" is pronounced as "t" in Telugu)
checkmate is called Āṭakaṭṭu
stalemate is called Āṭataṭṭu
king is called Rāju
square is called Gaḍi
piece is called Pikka
White is called Tella
Black is called Nalla

Valuations
The value of:
a Mantri is equal to 2 Enugulu and a single Banṭu
a Enugu is equal to a single Śagaṭu and 3 Banṭlu or  a single Gurramu and 3 Banṭlu
a Śagaṭu or a Gurramu is equal to 3 Banṭulu
Banṭlu before Raju are more and Śagaṭu or Gurramu can be sacrificed in exchange for two such Banṭlu

See also
 Origins of chess
 Indian chess
 Chaturaji—four-handed version of Chaturanga

References
Caturanga Darpanamu (1910) – Esvarappa Pantulu, Buddiraju

History of chess
Chess in India
Games related to chaturanga